Rugby sevens at the 2015 Pacific Games was held from 8–10 July at the Sir John Guise Stadium. In the men's tournament Fiji won the gold medal defeating defending champions Samoa by a 26 point margin in the final. Tonga took the bronze medal. Fiji also won the women's tournament, defeating Australia by a successful try conversion in the final, with hosts Papua New Guinea winning the bronze medal.

Events

Medal table

Medalists

Participating teams
Ten men's teams and seven women's teams played in the respective tournaments:

Men:
 
 
 
 
 
 
 
 
 
 

Women:

See also
 Rugby sevens at the Pacific Games

References

 
Rugby sevens
2015
2015 rugby sevens competitions
2015 in Oceanian rugby union
International rugby union competitions hosted by Papua New Guinea